Vineet Raina (born 30 August) is an Indian Bollywood film and television actor.

Filmography

Television 
{| class="wikitable sortable"
|-
! Year
! Title
! Role
! class="unsortable" | Notes
|-
| 2004-2005
| Tum Bin Jaaoon Kahaan
| Dhruv
| Lead role
|-
| 2005-2007
| Sindoor Tere Naam Ka
| Anuraag
Negative role
|
|-
|  2006
| Sati...Satya Ki Shakti
| Aarth Razdan
| Supporting Role 
|-
|  2006
| Sanyasi
| Nand Kishor
| Lead Role 
|-
|  2006
| Vaidehi
| Yashvardhan "Yash" Jaisingh
| Negative Role 
|-
|-
| rowspan="3" | 2007–2008
| Maryada... of an Indian family
| Krishna "Krish" Singh
| Lead Role 
|-
| Har Ghar Kuch Kehta Hai
| Akshay Thakral
| Lead Role 
|-
| Maayka
| Veer Khurana
| Lead Role 
|-
| 2008
| Ssshhhh...Koi Hai
| Dr. Gaurav Sharma
| Season 2; Episodes 126-127
|-
| 2008-2009
| Nach Baliye 4
| Contestant
| 
|-
| 2009
| Dhoop Mein Thandi Chaav...Maa
| Akshar
| Lead Role / Negative Role 
|-
| rowspan="2" | 2010
| Do Hanson Ka Jodaa
| Vinay
| Supporting role
|-
| Godh Bharaai
| Ajay
| Cameo role
|-
|-
| rowspan="2" | 2012
| Punar Vivah
| Prashant Satyendra Dubey
| Negative role 
|-
| Adaalat
| Debojit Sarkar
| Episodic appearance
|-
| rowspan="2" | 2013
| Yeh Hai Mohabbatein
| Mihir Arora
|-
| Yeh Hai Aashiqui - Season 1 (Episode 1: Tasveer)
| Manoj Mehra
| Negative role 
|-
| rowspan="2" | 2014
| Ishq Kills
| Karan
| Episode 1 
|-
| Lapataganj - Ek Baar Phir
| Lakhan / Bajrang Bajpayee
| Lead role
|-
| 2014–2016
| Udaan
| Arjun Khanna
| Lead role
|-
| rowspan="2" | 2015
| Bhanwar
| Shekhar
| Episodic appearance
|-
| Tum Hi Ho Bandhu Sakha Tumhi
| Amar Pethawala
| Lead Role 
|-
| 2015–2016
| Begusarai
| Bhanu
| Negative Role 
|-
| 2016
| Box Cricket League 2
| Contestant
| Player in Lucknow Nawabs
|-
| 2016–2017
| Kaala Teeka
| Dewri
| Negative Role 
|-
| 2017
| Pardes Mein Hai Mera Dil
| Rehaan Khurana 
| Lead Role 
|-
| 2017–2019
| Ishq Mein Marjawan
| Inspector Lakshya Pradhan / ACP Virat Raichand
| Negative Role
|-
| 2018
| Silsila Badalte Rishton Ka
| Guest
| Special appearance 
|-
| 2020
| Meri Gudiya
| Rahu
| Negative Role
|-
|2021–2022
| Choti Sarrdaarni
|Paramjeet Singh Gill
| Parallel Lead Role
|-
| 2022-present
| Ali Baba: Dastaan-E-Kabul| Qasim
|
|-
|}

 Films Janani as Rahul (Lead Role) Produced by ‘Ultra Distributors Pvt. Ltd The Sholay Girl'' (2019) Released on ZEE5 Premium OTT Platform

Webseries 
’’Kasak’’ (2020) Lead Role
 Nominated in the ‘’Best Actor’’ award Category for ‘’Filmfare OTT Awards 2020’’ for Critically acclaimed performance in the Webseries ’’Kasak’’, based on the true story, released on ‘’ULLU’’ OTT platform

References 

Indian male film actors
Indian male television actors
Male actors in Hindi cinema
Indian male soap opera actors
Living people
Male actors from Jammu and Kashmir
21st-century Indian male actors
Year of birth missing (living people)